The 1970 Giro d'Italia was the 53rd edition of the Giro, one of cycling's Grand Tours. The  race consisted of 20 stages, starting in San Pellegrino Terme on 18 May and finishing Bolzano on 7 June. There was one time trial stage and a single rest day. Eddy Merckx of the Faemino team won the overall general classification, his second victory. Italians Felice Gimondi (Salvarani) placed second, 3 min and 14 s slower than Merckx, and Martin Van Den Bossche (Molteni) was third, nearly five minutes behind Merckx.

Teams

A total of 13 teams were invited to participate in the 1970 Giro d'Italia. Each team sent a squad of ten riders, so the Giro began with a peloton of 130 cyclists. Out of the 130 riders that started this edition of the Giro d'Italia, a total of 97 riders made it to the finish in Bolzano.

The teams that took part in the race were:

Pre-race favorites

The starting peloton did feature the previous year's winner Felice Gimondi (Salvarani). Despite an initial unwillingness to participate relating to his expulsion the year before, Eddy Merckx chose to enter the race after the race organizers agreed to send all doping controls to Rome rather than conduct them in a van that moved with the race. Merckx entered as the primary favorite to win the race. He entered the race having already won several races that season including: Paris–Nice, Paris–Roubaix, and La Flèche Wallonne, among others. Le Confédéré felt that Merckx's greatest challenge would come not from Italian riders, but the Belgian Walter Godefroot (Salvarani). Godefroot was thought to be the leader for the Salvarani team as Gimondi entered the race in poor form. Gianni Motta was absent from the race as he was recovering from a knee operation earlier in the season.

Route and stages

The route was revealed on 31 March 1970 by race director Vincenzo Torriani. In April, the route was announced to have nineteen categorized climbs that awarded points towards the mountains classification, while the final route included seven more categorized climbs. In total,  were climbed.

San Pellegrino Terme hosted the race's start and then it travelled west, visiting the Alps before turning south and then east towards Treviso. A transfer then occurred to Terracina and the race moved north along the coast. The race made its way to the Dolomites for three stages before finishing in Bolzano. The route did not visit Milan for the first time in race history.

The route featured less transition stages than in previous years, which was thought to allow for more action in the race.

Classification leadership

Two different jerseys were worn during the 1970 Giro d'Italia. The leader of the general classification – calculated by adding the stage finish times of each rider – wore a pink jersey. This classification is the most important of the race, and its winner is considered as the winner of the Giro.

For the points classification, which awarded a cyclamen jersey to its leader, cyclists were given points for finishing a stage in the top 15. Before the start of the 1970, Termozeta replaced Dreher Brewery as the sponsor of the points classification and so the color of the leader's jersey changed from red to cyclamen. The mountains classification leader. The climbs were ranked in first and second categories, the former awarded 50, 30, and 20 points while the latter awarded 30, 20, and 10 points. In this ranking, points were won by reaching the summit of a climb ahead of other cyclists. In addition there was the Cima Coppi, the Passo Pordoi, which was the highest mountain crossed in this edition of the race, which gave 200, 100, 80, 70, and 50 points to the first five riders summit the climb. The first rider over the Passo Pordoi was Luciano Armani. Although no jersey was awarded, there was also one classification for the teams, in which the stage finish times of the best three cyclists per team were added; the leading team was the one with the lowest total time.

Final standings

General classification

Mountains classification

Points classification

Traguardi tricolori classification

Teams classification

References

Citations

Bibliography

 

 
1970
Giro d'Italia, 1970
Giro d'Italia, 1970
Giro d'Italia
Giro d'Italia
1970 Super Prestige Pernod